Peta Mullens (born 8 March 1988) is an Australian racing cyclist, who currently rides for UCI Women's Continental Team  in road cycling, and Focus Attaquer in the mountain biking and cyclo-cross disciplines of the sport. She is a former Australian road cycling, MTB and cyclo-cross champion.

She has also competed professionally with the  team.

Major results

2002
 1st  National Under-18 Mountain Running Championships
2004
 3rd Individual pursuit, National Youth Track Championships
 3rd Individual pursuit, Junior Oceania Games
2005
 3rd Individual pursuit, National Junior Track Championships
2006
 1st  Individual pursuit, National Junior Track Championships
 3rd Individual pursuit, UCI Juniors World Championships
 3rd Overall Tour of Southern Grampians
2007
 1st Overall Tour of Southern Grampians
1st Stages 1, 2 & 4
 3rd Road race, Oceania Games
 3rd Overall Canberra Tour
1st Stage 3
 3rd Overall UniSA Women's Criterium Series
2008
 1st Overall Tour of Southern Grampians
1st Stage 2
 7th Sparkassen Giro Bochum
2009
 National Road Championships
1st  Under-23 road race
3rd Under-23 criterium
7th Road race
 2nd Cross-country marathon, National Mountain Bike Championships
 4th Road race, Oceania Road Championships
 9th Wellington Women's Race
2010
 3rd Criterium, National Road Championships
2011
 1st Overall Tour de Timor
 7th Road race, Oceania Road Championships
 7th Cross-country, Oceania Mountain Bike Championships
2012
 1st  Cross-country marathon, National Mountain Bike Championships
2013
 1st  Cross-country, National Mountain Bike Championships
 1st Round 2, NSW International Grand Prix criterium series – Wollongong
 National Mountain Bike Series
1st Mount Buller
2nd Thredbo
 10th Road race, National Road Championships
2014
 National Mountain Bike Championships
1st  Cross-country eliminator
2nd Cross-country
 1st  Points classification Bay Classic Series
 2nd Criterium, National Road Championships
 National Mountain Bike Series
2nd Moama
3rd Eagle Park
 4th Cross-country eliminator, UCI Mountain Bike World Cup, Nové Město na Moravě
 6th GP Comune di Cornaredo
2015
 National Road Championships
1st  Road race
2nd Criterium
 1st National Mountain Bike Series, Pemberton
 National Mountain Bike Championships
2nd Cross-country eliminator
2nd Cross-country
 6th Overall Bay Classic Series
1st Stage 3
2016
 2nd Cross-country, Oceania Mountain Bike Championships
 2nd Cross-country, National Mountain Bike Championships
 2nd National Cyclo-cross Championships
 10th Cadel Evans Great Ocean Road Race
2017
 1st  National Cyclo-cross Championships
 1st Melbourne Grand Prix of Cyclocross
 5th Winston-Salem Cycling Classic
 6th Overall Santos Women's Tour
2018
 9th White Spot / Delta Road Race
2019
 1st  National Cyclo-cross Championships
 1st Melbourne to Warrnambool Classic
2020
 1st National Criterium Series
 National Mountain Bike Championships
2nd Cross-country
2nd Cross-country short track
 National Road Championships
7th Road race
7th Criterium
 7th Race Torquay
 10th Overall Women's Tour Down Under
2021
 1st Stage 1 Santos Festival of Cyling

References

External links

 Peta Mullens at cyclocross24.com

Living people
Australian female cyclists
Cyclists at the 2014 Commonwealth Games
Commonwealth Games competitors for Australia
1988 births
People from Sale, Victoria
Cyclists from Victoria (Australia)